Saphenista splendida is a species of moth of the family Tortricidae. It is found in Morona-Santiago Province, Ecuador.

The wingspan is about 24 mm. The ground colour of the forewings is whitish, suffused grey with brown suffusions in the dorsal and postbasal areas and more ochreous admixture subterminally. The basal part of the costa is tinged with yellow. The hindwings are creamy white, but grey in the anal and apical parts.

References

Moths described in 2002
Saphenista